The 1898 Kansas gubernatorial election was held on November 8, 1898. Republican nominee William Eugene Stanley defeated People's Party incumbent John W. Leedy with 51.81% of the vote.

General election

Candidates
Major party candidates 
William Eugene Stanley, Republican

Other candidates
John W. Leedy, People's
William A. Peffer, Prohibition
Caleb Lipscomb, Socialist Labor

Results

References

1898
Kansas
Gubernatorial